The Seattle Cash Spiel was an annual bonspiel, or curling tournament, that took place in late November at the Granite Curling Club in Seattle, Washington. The tournament was held in a triple knockout format. The tournament was part of the World Curling Tour.

Past champions
Only skip's name is displayed.

External links
Granite Curling Club Home

Former World Curling Tour events
Sports competitions in Seattle
Curling competitions in the United States
Curling in Washington (state)